Robert Davidson (born 12 July 1958) is an Australian fencer. He competed at the 1988 and 1992 Summer Olympics.

References

External links
 

1958 births
Living people
Australian male fencers
Olympic fencers of Australia
Fencers at the 1988 Summer Olympics
Fencers at the 1992 Summer Olympics